The Neversink Gorge is located in the town of Forestburgh, New York, USA, and is one of the more outstanding features of the Neversink River.  A portion of the western side of the gorge, above Denton Falls, through High Falls, to the entrance of Eden Brook, is a private nature sanctuary called The Turner Brook Reserve; the entire eastern side and the remaining western property is a New York State Department of Environmental Conservation (DEC) controlled Unique Area, often called the Neversink Gorge Unique Area.

History

The current borders of the Neversink Gorge Unique Area and the private lands in the Neversink Gorge were amassed as a  private game preserve by Ambrose Monel in the late 1890s through the early 1900s. Monel, who was president of International Nickel and patented Monel Metal, was inspired by the conservation ethic established by John Burroughs and John Muir to purchase farms, tanneries and even entire towns, demolish the buildings and revert the land to its wild state. Within this sportsperson's paradise, the greatest names in American fly fishing, Edward Ringwood Hewitt, George M. L. La Branche, Justin Askins, Phil Chase, and Theodore Gordon, have practiced their passion and  refined their techniques. Their subsequent writings about their adventures in the area have brought many others here to hone their skills.

When Monel died the property passed to the Bradford family and was then purchased by the Wechsler family in 1939.  The Wechsler family, having made their fortune in coffee distribution, founded Restaurant Associates that at its peak owned 50 eateries in New York City. With this wealth Philip Wechsler hired architect Eugene Schoen to build 5 homes on Gilman Pond in Frank Lloyd Wright's Usonian style with the turn of the century stone structure that was Monel's mansion as the central "Lodge" named by Monel, The Four Way Lodge. They dubbed this family compound The Philwold Estates (Phil Wold = Phil's Woods in German). The extended Wechsler family resided there for a time and gradually sold the homes off.

References

Canyons and gorges of New York (state)
Neversink River
New York (state) unique areas
Protected areas of Sullivan County, New York
Landforms of Sullivan County, New York